The 4th Lavant Cup was a non-championship Formula Two motor race held at Goodwood Circuit on 14 April 1952. The race was won by Mike Hawthorn in a Cooper T20-Bristol, setting fastest lap in the process. Alan Brown and Eric Brandon in the same model of car were second and third.

Results

References

Lavant Cup
Lavant Cup
Lavant Cup